The gens Egilia was a plebeian family at Rome.  It is known chiefly from a single individual, Lucius Egilius, one of three commissioners who superintended the foundation of the colony planted at Luca, in 177 BC.

See also
 List of Roman gentes

References

Roman gentes